Ben William Sanderson (born 3 January 1989) is an English first-class cricketer. He is a seam bowler, capable of opening the bowling, and an aggressive batsman and fielder.

Sanderson began his career with Yorkshire County Cricket Club he made his first-class debut for Yorkshire, against Durham, at the Riverside Ground in Chester-le-Street, on 14 May 2008. In September 2011, Yorkshire announced that Sanderson was being released by the county. He then spent time playing minor county cricket for Shropshire, club cricket for Rotherham Town and working as a builder.

On 18 July 2015 Sanderson made his return to first-class cricket playing for Northants against Derbyshire, and later signed a two-year contract to play for Northants. During the 2016 season, he took 55 first-class wickets at an average of 21.89, including career best figures of 8/73 against Gloucestershire in September. He was also on the victorious side in the Twenty20 cup, taking 3/31 against Durham in the final. He was rewarded for these performances with a new three-year contract.

References

External links

1989 births
Living people
Yorkshire cricketers
Cricketers from Sheffield
English cricketers
Shropshire cricketers
Northamptonshire cricketers
English cricketers of the 21st century